Sándor Zámbó (born 10 October 1944 in Újpest, Hungary) is a former Hungarian footballer. He spent all of his professional career at Újpesti Dózsa from 1963 to 1980.

He played 33 games and scored 3 goals for the Hungary national football team, and is most famous for his participation in Hungarian UEFA Euro 1972 team.

Zámbó won 9 Hungarian championship titles with Újpest and played in the Inter-Cities Fairs Cup Final in 1969.

Sources
 Ki kicsoda a magyar sportéletben?, III. kötet (S–Z). Szekszárd, Babits Kiadó, 1995, 322. o.,  
 Rejtő László–Lukács László–Szepesi György: Felejthetetlen 90 percek (Sportkiadó, 1977)  
nemzetisport.hu: Ládát pakol az újpesti kedvenc 

1944 births
Living people
Hungary international footballers
Hungarian footballers
People from Újpest
UEFA Euro 1972 players
Újpest FC players
Association football forwards